Continental League may refer to:

 Continental League, a historically proposed baseball league
 Continental Football League
 Continental Indoor Football League
 Continental Hockey League (1972–1986)
 Continental Indoor Soccer League
 Continental Baseball League
 Continental Elite Hockey League